Cecilie Sentow (born 28 February 1994) is a Danish female badminton player.

Achievements

BWF International Challenge/Series
Women's Doubles

Mixed Doubles

 BWF International Challenge tournament
 BWF International Series tournament
 BWF Future Series tournament

References

External links
 

1994 births
Living people
Danish female badminton players